Bentayan is a state constituency in Johor, Malaysia, that is represented in the Johor State Legislative Assembly.

The state constituency was first contested in 2004 and is mandated to return a single Assemblyman to the Johor State Legislative Assembly under the first-past-the-post voting system. , the State Assemblyman for Bentayan is Ng Yak Howe from the Democratic Action Party (DAP), which is part of the state's ruling coalition, Pakatan Harapan (PH).

Definition 
The Bentayan constituency contains the polling districts of Jalan Ismail, Parit Beting, Sabak Awor, Parit Tiram, Bentayan, Pasar, Bandar Timor, Jalan Daud Timor, Jalan Daud Barat, Taman Orkid, Sungai Abong Tengah, Sungai Abong Baru and Bandar Barat.

History

Polling districts 
According to the federal gazette issued on 30 March 2018, the Bentayan constituency is divided into 13 polling districts.

Representation history

Election results

References 

Johor state constituencies
Muar District